Shadow of Time may refer to:

Shadow of Time (album), a 1993 studio album by Irish music ensemble Nightnoise
Shadows of Time, a 2004 Bengali language German film by Florian Gallenberger
The Shadow Out of Time, a 1936 horror novella by American author Howard Phillips Lovecraft